Max Leetzow (born September 17, 1943) is a former American football defensive end and defensive tackle. He played for the Denver Broncos from 1965 to 1966.

References

1943 births
Living people
American football defensive ends
American football defensive tackles
Idaho Vandals football players
Denver Broncos players